Marcus Ball (born July 21, 1987) is a professional Canadian football linebacker who is currently a free agent. Ball went undrafted in the 2012 NFL Draft but signed with the Toronto Argonauts of the CFL. Ball attended Stephenson High School in Stone Mountain, Georgia, where he was voted Class 5A defensive player of the year. He played college football at Florida State, Pearl River Community College, and Memphis. Ball has also been a member of the New Orleans Saints, Carolina Panthers, Jacksonville Jaguars, San Francisco 49ers, and Calgary Stampeders.

Professional career

Toronto Argonauts
After going undrafted in the 2012 NFL Draft Ball signed with Toronto Argonauts (CFL) on September 10, 2012. the In two seasons with the Toronto Argonauts (CFL), Ball had 142 tackles, 7 sacks, 3 fumble recoveries, and 4 interceptions (with 2 touchdown returns). He was a key contributor to the defensive unit that helped the Argos to win the 100th Grey Cup at home in Toronto. On February 17, 2014, Ball was released by the Argonauts to pursue NFL opportunities.

New Orleans Saints
Ball signed a three-year contract with the New Orleans Saints on April 2, 2014, but was released on May 4, 2015.

Carolina Panthers
On May 21, 2015, Ball signed with the Carolina Panthers. On September 5, 2015, he was released by the Panthers. He was re-signed to the practice squad on September 29. During the 2015 season Ball was accused of threatening New York Giants wide receiver Odell Beckham Jr. while holding a baseball bat on the field prior to the game on December 20, 2015. On February 7, 2016, Ball's Panthers played in Super Bowl 50. In the game, the Panthers fell to the Denver Broncos by a score of 24–10. On February 9, 2016. Ball signed a futures contract with the Carolina Panthers. On September 3, 2016, Ball was waived by the Panthers as part of final roster cuts. The next day, he was signed to the Panthers' practice squad.  On September 23, Ball was elevated to the active roster to replace injured teammate Dean Marlowe. He was released on September 27, 2016. He re-signed to the practice squad on September 29. He was released on October 12, 2016.

Jacksonville Jaguars
On October 12, 2016, Ball was signed to the Jacksonville Jaguars' practice squad. On October 24, Ball was waived by the Jaguars.

San Francisco 49ers
On November 22, 2016, Ball was signed to the San Francisco 49ers' practice squad. He was promoted to the active roster on November 29, 2016. On May 2, 2017, Ball was waived by the 49ers.

Toronto Argonauts (II)
On May 25, 2017, it was announced that Ball had signed with the Toronto Argonauts (CFL) at the start of the CFL training camp season. Ball was named a CFL East All-Star for his efforts during the 2017 cFL season, contributing with 57 defensive tackles, seven special teams tackles, two interceptions and one forced fumble. The following season, Ball played in 10 games for the Argos and amassed 44 defensive tackles. He missed the remainder of the season with a hamstring injury. At age 32 He was not resigned following the 2018 CFL season and became a free agent in February 2019.

Calgary Stampeders 
On October 1, 2019, Ball signed with the Calgary Stampeders roughly two-thirds of the way through the 2019 CFL season. However, about two weeks later, it was revealed that Ball had suffered a torn ACL and would miss the remainder of the season.

References

External links
Carolina Panthers bio
New Orleans Saints bio
CFL profile page

1987 births
Living people
Florida State Seminoles football players
Memphis Tigers football players
African-American players of American football
African-American players of Canadian football
Toronto Argonauts players
New Orleans Saints players
Carolina Panthers players
Jacksonville Jaguars players
San Francisco 49ers players
American football defensive backs
Canadian football defensive backs
Players of American football from Georgia (U.S. state)
Players of American football from Norfolk, Virginia
Players of Canadian football from Norfolk, Virginia
Sportspeople from DeKalb County, Georgia
Calgary Stampeders players
21st-century African-American sportspeople
20th-century African-American people